LZP may refer to:

 Latvian Green Party (Latvijas Zaļā partija), a green political party in Latvia
 Lithuanian Green Party (Lietuvos Žaliųjų Partija), a green-liberal political party in Lithuania